Autodefensas (Spanish for self-defenders) may refer to various Latin American vigilante groups:

Colombia
 Right-wing paramilitarism in Colombia
 United Self-Defenders of Colombia (AUC)
 Peasant Self-Defenders of Córdoba and Urabá (ACCU)

Mexico
Grupos de Autodefensa Comunitaria, in the Gulf and South Mexico

See also
Auto Defense Choc, Laos